Christmas Classics is an album from Australian children's music group, The Wiggles. It is a collection of 10 Christmas songs that have been classics recorded throughout their history of the three past Christmas albums. This was also known to be the 4th Christmas album to be released. This was the last album to feature Greg Page as the yellow wiggle til the 2012 release Surfer Jeff.

Track listing

Australian release
Silent Night (Noche De Paz)
O Come All Ye Faithful
Unto Us This Holy Night
Feliz Navidad
Jingle Bells
Away in a Manger
We Wish You a Merry Christmas
The Little Drummer Boy 
The First Noel 
Angels We Have Heard on High

US release
Silent Night (Noche De Paz)
O Come All Ye Faithful
Rudolph the Red-Nosed Reindeer
Feliz Navidad
Jingle Bells
Away in a Manger
We Wish You a Merry Christmas
The Little Drummer Boy 
The First Noel 
Angels We Have Heard on High

The Wiggles albums
2006 Christmas albums
Christmas albums by Australian artists